Tranel Hawkins (born 17 September 1962) is an American hurdler who competed in the 1984 Summer Olympics.

References

1962 births
Living people
American male hurdlers
Olympic track and field athletes of the United States
Athletes (track and field) at the 1984 Summer Olympics